Baima is a town under the administration of Lianyuan City in central Hunan province, China, situated about  to the south-southeast of downtown Lianyuan. , it has two residential communities and 23 villages under its administration.

Administrative division
The town is divided into 22 villages and three communities, including: 
Tianxinping Community
Baima Community
Luojiaping Community
Zhaojia Village
Sanxie Village
Xunan Village
Yuxi Village
Niujiaoshan Village
Quantang Village
Zoujia Village
Hongtian Village
Geshan Village
Lujiangbian Village
Santuan Village
Jiangxi Village
Sunjiaqiao Village
Jianxin Village
Xianxiu Village
Hongquan Village
Guangyuan Village
Tenglong Village
Taolintang Village
Tongbai Village
Jinbian Village
Wenhua Village

References

Divisions of Lianyuan